Randy Pitchford is an American businessman. He co-founded the video game development studio Gearbox Software in 1999 and was president and CEO for the company until 2021, upon which he became CEO and president of Gearbox's parent company, The Gearbox Entertainment Company.

Early life and education 
Pitchford's father worked within the United States intelligence system, creating high-technology equipment for agents. When Randy was five years old, his father brought home one of the computers he had developed in 1975, and later gave Randy his own computer, built by himself, when Randy was seven. Pitchford learned BASIC to try to emulate arcade games of the time. He wrote his first game (a 16-room text adventure) when he was about 11 or 12 on the machine. Pitchford stated that he played Colossal Cave Adventure and was so enamored by the game that he used a hex editor to examine the code and figure out some of the programming concepts behind it.

After high school, Pitchford went to University of California, Los Angeles, where his future wife encouraged him to pursue a career in entertainment.

Interest in magic 
Pitchford's great uncle was Richard Valentine Pitchford, a British magician under the stage name Cardini. Pitchford inherited many of Cardini's books and developed an interest in magic at a young age. The Magic Castle in Hollywood, California has an exhibit dedicated to Cardini, which contains props Pitchford donated to the Academy of Magical Arts for the display. While he proceeded to work on video games on the side, he continued to perform as a professional magician in Hollywood to help pay for school. 

Throughout his career in video games, Pitchford has continued to perform as a magician. In 2016, Pitchford purchased Genii, the top publication for magic and magicians. He is a member of The Magic Castle in Los Angeles, and in April 2022, was in the final stages of acquiring The Magic Castle. Erika Larsen, daughter of the Magic Castle's founders, will operate the venue. The Academy of Magical Arts, of which Pitchford is a member, will remain a tenant.

Career 
Pitchford began his career at 3D Realms in Texas working on games such as Duke Nukem 3D and Shadow Warrior. A group of 3D Realms developers and programmers left the company to form Rebel Boat Rocker around 1997, and Pitchford joined them in May 1997. The company's first game was to be the first-person shooter Prax War to be published by Electronic Arts (EA). Pitchford served as the lead level designer as well as the public relations head. However, EA opted to cancel the game around January 1999. With no publisher-backed project, Pitchford joined four other Rebel Boat Rockers, some his former 3D Realms colleagues, to found Gearbox Software in February 1999.

Overall, Pitchford's credited titles have sold more than 100 million copies. Games he has overseen at Gearbox have included Borderlands, Bulletstorm, and Borderlands 3. As part of his leadership in Borderlands 3, he helped to bring a distributed computing puzzle game into Borderlands 3 that supported the American Gut Project to help with RNA sequencing in collaboration with researchers at McGill University and University of California San Diego.

Gearbox expanded out into publishing in 2015, and by 2019, The Gearbox Entertainment Company was established to be the parent company of both Gearbox Software and Gearbox Publishing. During this period, Pitchford remained the president of Gearbox Software. The Gearbox Entertainment Company was acquired by Embracer Group in February 2021 and incorporated in whole as one of the top-level divisions within Embracer. Following completion of the acquisition and the creating of Gearbox Studios, Pitchford left Gearbox Software to become president and CEO of The Gearbox Entertainment Company and president of Gearbox Studios. Part of Pitchford's role in Gearbox Studios was to serve as executive producer for the Borderlands film.

Works

Crowdfunding 
In 2013, Pitchford received an executive producer credit on the film Director's Cut, as well as Penn Jillette's ponytail, for pledging US$25,000 to its crowdfunding campaign. In March 2018, Pitchford announced he had joined the advisory board for Fig, a mixed investor/crowdfunding service for video game development.

Litigation 
In 2018, former Gearbox lawyer Wade Callender filed a lawsuit against Pitchford, that alleged that Pitchford had left a USB drive containing sensitive Gearbox information and "child pornography" at a Medieval Times in 2014. Pitchford clarified that the pornographic film on the USB drive was not child pornography and stated that he had saved the pornography for the purposes of studying a sexual act performed by the female actress that he claimed to be similar to a "magic trick." Gearbox filed a grievance with the State Bar of Texas against Callender for "filing a lawsuit that includes accusations that he knows to be untrue". Callender later provided documents that he claimed backed up his position. An August 2019 filing further alleged Pitchford and his employers of contempt. In October 2019, both sides announced that the lawsuit had been dropped, and a joint statement by the parties called the issue a misunderstanding, and further stated that Pitchford had been exonerated.

In May 2019, David Eddings, the voice actor of the Borderlands character Claptrap accused Pitchford of assault during the 2017 Game Developers Conference. According to Eddings, Pitchford physically shoved Eddings after mentioning to Pitchford that he had been told someone was attempting to buy Gearbox as well as mentioning the Callender lawsuit. Eddings was let go shortly after the event, which he states was why he did not voice Claptrap in Borderlands 3. Pitchford denied he assaulted Eddings, and Gearbox stated they took the matter seriously but made no further comment as it was a personal matter.

Personal life 
Pitchford has a son.

References 

American technology chief executives
American video game designers
American video game directors
American video game producers
Date of birth missing (living people)
Living people
Place of birth missing (living people)
Video game businesspeople
Year of birth missing (living people)